Bir Kasdali is a town and commune in Bordj Bou Arréridj Province, Algeria. It is located between Bordj Bou Arreridj and Sétif. It is a Daira, has a Khelil and Sidi Embarek. According to the 2010 census it has a population of 19,622.

References

Communes of Bordj Bou Arréridj Province
Bordj Bou Arréridj Province